Coming In for the Kill is the second and last album by British pop duo Climie Fisher, released in October 1989.  The album was less successful than its predecessor Everything, peaking at #35 in the United Kingdom.  The track "Facts of Love" would later be covered by Christian pop singer, Kim Boyce three years later on her 1992 album of the same name.

In 2009 the record company Edsel re-released and remastered both Climie Fisher albums, and included all the original b-sides, with the notable exception of the original version of "Love Like a River".

Track listing
All tracks written by Simon Climie, Rob Fisher, and Dennis Morgan except where indicated.
 "Facts of Love" - 3:43
 "Fire on the Ocean"- 4:17
 "It’s Not Supposed to Be That Way" - 3:48
 "Hold on Through the Night" - 3:53
 "Buried Treasure" - 4:33
 "Power of the Dreamworld" - 5:14
 "The Best Part of Living" - 3:51
 "Coming In for the Kill" (Simon Climie, Lamont Dozier, Rob Fisher) - 4:13
 "Don’t Mess Around" - 3:35
 "You Keep Me Coming Back for More..." - 4:08
 "Memories (If I Could Relive Your Love)" - 5:58

2009 re-release track listing
 "Facts of Love" - 3:43
 "Fire on the Ocean" - 4:17
 "It’s Not Supposed to Be That Way" - 3:48
 "Hold on Through the Night" - 3:53
 "Buried Treasure" - 4:33
 "Power of the Dreamworld" - 5:14
 "The Best Part of Living" - 3:51
 "Coming In for the Kill"  - 4:13
 "Don’t Mess Around" - 3:35
 "You Keep Me Coming Back for More..." - 4:08
 "Cold Light of Day" - 3:43
 "Gypsy" - 3:50
 "Memories (If I Could Relive Your Love)" (Climie, Fisher, Dennis Morgan) - 5:58
 "Godsend" (Climie, Fisher, Morgan) - 4:07
 "You're Not Alone in This World" (Climie, Fisher, Morgan) - 5:57
 "Rhythm of the World" - 4:23
 "The Way It Should Be" - 6:30

Personnel 

Climie Fisher
 Simon Climie – vocals
 Rob Fisher – keyboards, bass and drum programming

Additional musicians
 Jeff Bova – additional keyboard programming (1)
 Steve Khan – guitar (1, 3, 6, 8), acoustic guitar (2), lead guitar (7)
 Eddie Martinez – guitar (1)
 Chester Kamen – lead guitar (2)
 Neil Taylor– rhythm guitar (2), guitar (4, 11)
 J.J. Belle – guitar (3, 5, 9, 10), rhythm guitar (7)
 Nathan East – bass guitar (1-4, 6)
 Pino Palladino – fretless bass (5) 
 Jimmy Bralower – additional drum programming (1)
 Richie Stevens – drums (7)
 Carol Steele – percussion (1-4, 6, 8, 10)
 Lenny Castro – percussion (7)
 Tawatha Agee – backing vocals (1, 3, 4, 6, 7, 8)
 Frank Simms – backing vocals (1, 6)
 Vaneese Thomas – backing vocals (1, 6)
 Fonzi Thornton – backing vocals (1, 3, 4, 6-9)
 Dee Lewis – backing vocals (2, 3, 5, 7, 9, 10)
 Mae McKenna – backing vocals (2)
 Brenda White-King – backing vocals (3, 7, 8, 9)
 Curtis King – backing vocals (3, 4, 7, 8, 9)
 Shirley Lewis – backing vocals (7, 11)

Production 
 Producers – Climie Fisher (Tracks 1-4, 6 & 8-11); Neil Dorfsman (Tracks 1 & 6); Stuart Levine (Tracks 5 & 7).
 Additional Producer on Track 2 – Bob Clearmountain
 Engineers – Neil Dorfsman (Tracks 1 & 6); Pete Schwier (Tracks 2, 4 & 7-10); Josh Abbey (Tracks 3, 4 & 8-11); Bob Kraushaar (Track 3); Darren Klein (Tracks 5 & 7); Climie Fisher (Track 11).
 Assistant Engineer on Track 1 – Gary Solomon
 Recorded at Abbey Road Studios, Mayfair Studios, Advision Studios, Sarm Studios and Metropolis Studios (London, England, UK); The Power Station, Skyline Studios and Marathon Studios (New York, NY, USA); Conway Studios and Sunset Sound (Hollywood, CA, USA).
 Mixing – Bob Clearmountain (Track 1, 2 & 4); Josh Abbey (Tracks 3 & 7-11).
 Design – Bill Smith Studio
 Photography – Paul Cox

Singles
"Facts of Love" (UK #50, Germany #54)
"Fire on the Ocean" (UK #89) 
"It's Not Supposed to Be That Way" (UK #77)

Chart performance

References

Climie Fisher albums
1989 albums
EMI Records albums
Albums produced by Simon Climie